Wesley Claudio Campos (born 10 February 1995), known simply as Wesley is a Brazilian footballer who plays as a right back for Internacional.

Career
Wesley began his career at Grêmio Foot-Ball Porto Alegrense. In September 2015, he was an unused substitute in three matches of the year's Campeonato Brasileiro Série A.

The following 29 January, he made his senior debut in a youthful team at the start of the year's Primeira Liga, playing the full 90 minutes of a 2–2 draw at Avaí. On 10 February, he played his first game in the Campeonato Gaúcho, a 1–0 victory at Veranópolis.

References

External links

1995 births
Living people
Brazilian footballers
Association football defenders
Grêmio Foot-Ball Porto Alegrense players
Sport Club Internacional players